Mikhail Petrovich Aleshin (born 22 May 1987 in Moscow, Soviet Union) is a Russian professional racing driver and the 2010 champion of the Formula Renault 3.5 Series.

Career
Aleshin competed in karting from 1996 to 2000. Since 2001 he has taken part in various international open wheel series. On 14 April 2007 he became the first Russian driver to win a major international single-seater race when he won the opening round of the Formula Renault 3.5 Series season at Monza. He then deputised for the injured Michael Ammermüller in the ART Grand Prix team at the second round of the 2007 GP2 Series season, becoming the second Russian after Vitaly Petrov to race in the series. He remained in FR3.5 for 2008, taking his best finish in the championship so far despite not winning a race.

He joined the relaunched FIA Formula Two Championship for 2009, driving car number 15. He finished third in the championship, with a single win coming at Oschersleben.

Aleshin returned to Formula Renault 3.5 for the 2010 season, partnering Jake Rosenzweig at Carlin. Scoring three victories, he became the champion of the series.

Aleshin remained with Carlin to drive in 2011 GP2 Series and 2011 GP2 Asia Series, the team's first season in the category and Aleshin's first attempt at the series since 2007. He was partnered by Max Chilton, another driver who had previously been employed by Carlin in lower formulae. He endured a frustrating Asia series, afflicted by technical problems which left him last in the drivers' championship, before announcing that he did not have a budget to compete in the main series, and would henceforth be stepping back to the ATS Formel 3 Cup. He then, however, secured a last-minute temporary GP2 deal with Carlin, only to crash in qualifying for the first round of the season in Turkey, injuring metacarpals in both hands which prevented him from racing. He returned to action for the following round of the championship at Catalunya, but was then replaced by Oliver Turvey as his money ran out. After eight races on the sidelines, he returned to racing action with Carlin at the Hungaroring. He was replaced again by Parente for the season finale at Monza, and finished 32nd and last in the overall standings.

In 2014 Aleshin began racing in the IndyCar Series with Schmidt Peterson Motorsports.

Fontana crash
At Fontana in the final race of the 2014 IndyCar season, Aleshin was practicing his race-car before the race. The first driver from Russia to race in the Verizon IndyCar Series, Aleshin was in Turn 4 of the two-mile Fontana track—a track where the cars travel at more than 200 mph—when the accident occurred.

Aleshin's No. 7 car was driving low on the track before clipping the apron at the bottom, this unsettled the car and subsequently sent it into a spin. Charlie Kimball, who was running the high line, had no time to react to Aleshin's car that was sliding up the track before him and he slammed into Aleshin at almost full speed. The impact sent both cars into the outside retaining wall where the upwards momentum of Aleshin's out of control car caused it to vault up and over Kimball and the nose speared through the catch fencing, causing it to pirouette against the fence. Aleshin's car then fell back onto the track as pieces of the car were scattered for yards and a large section of the catch fencing was ripped down. Kimball was able to get out of his car on his own, however, Aleshin was rushed to the hospital in a critical condition.

"The 7 car spun from the bottom and I really had nowhere to go," said Kimball, who was not hurt. Aleshin, meanwhile, was diagnosed with a concussion, fractured ribs, a broken right clavicle and chest injuries.

Motorsports career results

Career summary

† As Aleshin was a guest driver, he was ineligible for championship points.

Complete Formula Renault 3.5 Series results
(key) (Races in bold indicate pole position) (Races in italics indicate fastest lap)

Complete GP2 Series results
(key) (Races in bold indicate pole position) (Races in italics indicate fastest lap)

Complete GP2 Asia Series results
(key) (Races in bold indicate pole position) (Races in italics indicate fastest lap)

Complete FIA Formula Two Championship results
(key) (Races in bold indicate pole position) (Races in italics indicate fastest lap)

24 Hours of Daytona
(key)

IndyCar Series
(key)

Indianapolis 500

Complete European Le Mans Series results

Complete 24 Hours of Le Mans results

Complete FIA World Endurance Championship results

References

External links

 
 
 Driver Database

Living people
1987 births
Sportspeople from Moscow
Russian racing drivers
German Formula Renault 2.0 drivers
Italian Formula Renault 2.0 drivers
Formula Renault Eurocup drivers
A1 Team Russia drivers
GP2 Series drivers
FIA Formula Two Championship drivers
Russian GP3 Series drivers
German Formula Three Championship drivers
World Series Formula V8 3.5 drivers
GP2 Asia Series drivers
Blancpain Endurance Series drivers
24 Hours of Daytona drivers
WeatherTech SportsCar Championship drivers
24 Hours of Le Mans drivers
24 Hours of Spa drivers
IndyCar Series drivers
European Le Mans Series drivers
Indianapolis 500 drivers
FIA World Endurance Championship drivers
Carlin racing drivers
ART Grand Prix drivers
SMP Racing drivers
A1 Grand Prix drivers
Superleague Formula drivers
JD Motorsport drivers
Tech 1 Racing drivers
Arrow McLaren SP drivers
AF Corse drivers